Roni Syrjälä (born 28 March 1995) is a Finnish handball player who plays for Riihimäen Cocks and the Finnish national team.

References

1995 births
Living people
People from Riihimäki
Finnish male handball players
Sportspeople from Kanta-Häme